Bussea eggelingii is a species of legume in the family Fabaceae.
It is found only in Tanzania.
It is threatened by habitat loss.

References 

Caesalpinioideae
Endemic flora of Tanzania
Endangered flora of Africa
Taxonomy articles created by Polbot